Emma Danieli (born Emma Fretta; 14 October 1936 – 21 June 1998) was an Italian actress and television personality.

Life and career
Born in Curtatone, Mantua, Danieli started her career at very young age as an actress of commercials. After winning a beauty contest, she made her film debut in 1953, in the anthology film Siamo donne. While her film career ended after a little more than a decade, Danieli was better appreciated on television, where she was one of the first announcers as well as a TV presenter and an actress in television films and series. She was also active on stage. Danieli was married to director Franco Morabito.

Selected filmography

We, the Women (1953)
Doctor Antonio (1954)
Devil's Cavaliers (1959)
The Corsican Brothers (1961)
Guns of the Black Witch (1961)
The Last Man on Earth (1964)
Slalom (1965)
God's Thunder (1965)
The Spy Who Loved Flowers (1966)
Spies Strike Silently (1966)
Commissariato di notturna (1974)

References

External links

Actors from the Province of Mantua
Italian stage actresses
Italian film actresses
Italian television actresses
1936 births
1998 deaths
20th-century Italian actresses
Italian television presenters
Italian women television presenters